The 2022 Pan American Fencing Championships were held in Asunción, Paraguay at the Polideportivo Central del Parque Olímpico from June 3 to June 8, 2022.

This tournament qualified fencers for the 2023 Pan American Games in Santiago, Chile.

Paraguay won its first ever Pan American Fencing Championships senior medal, after Montserrat Viveros won the bronze medal in the individual Épée event.

Medal summary

Medal table

Men's events

Women's events

References

Pan American Fencing Championships
Pan American Fencing Championships
Fencing in Paraguay
International sports competitions in Asunción
Qualification tournaments for the 2023 Pan American Games